Shamiram may refer to:

 Shamiram, Armenia
 Shamiram (legend), a legendary Assyrian queen
Shammuramat, the real Assyrian queen she was based on
 Shamiram Urshan (1938–2011), Iranian singer